An icebox cake (also known as a chocolate ripple cake or log  in Australia) is a dairy-based dessert made with cream, fruits, nuts, and wafers and set in the refrigerator. One particularly well-known version is the back-of-the-box recipe on thin and dark Nabisco Famous Chocolate Wafers.

History
The icebox cake is derived from similar desserts such as the charlotte and the trifle, but made to be more accessible for housewives to prepare. It was first introduced to the United States in the 1920s, as companies were promoting the icebox as a kitchen appliance. Its popularity rose in the 1920s and 30s, as it used many commercial shortcuts and pre-made ingredients. In response to the dish's popularity, companies that manufactured ingredients for the cake, such as condensed milk and wafer cookies, began printing recipes on the backs of their boxes.

Regional variations

American
The Nabisco version of the icebox cake indicates that the wafers are stacked to form a log with whipped cream cementing them together, and then the log is laid on its side. A second log is formed and the two are set side by side and more whipped cream covers the exterior. The cake is then left overnight in the refrigerator (or icebox). The wafers absorb moisture from the whipped cream and the whole can be served in slices. The dessert is usually served by cutting it into slices at a 45-degree angle, so bands of chocolate and cream are visible across each slice.

A variation of icebox cake is made using pudding (usually chocolate) and graham crackers or vanilla wafers layered in a square or rectangular baking dish. Additional variations include alternating layers of chocolate and vanilla pudding, or the addition of sliced bananas or pineapples between the layers.  While this can be done with cold instant pudding, if given ample time in the refrigerator, the best results come from assembling the dessert with still-hot, stove-cooked pudding, and then refrigerating overnight.

Australian
In Australia the cake is made from Arnott's Chocolate Ripple biscuits, hence the name in that country of Chocolate Ripple cake. The biscuits are covered in sweetened whipped cream, and placed in a log formation. This dessert is typically made the day before serving and kept in the refrigerator overnight. It is often decorated with crumbled chocolate, fresh berries or grated Peppermint Crisp.

Philippines

In the Philippines, mango float is a popular icebox cake variant of the traditional crema de fruta layered dessert. It is made with graham crackers or broas (ladyfingers) in between layers of whipped cream, condensed milk, and fresh mangoes.

United Kingdom
A biscuit cake is an icebox cake commonly served as a tea cake in the United Kingdom. At the request of Prince William a chocolate biscuit cake was served as a groom's cake at his wedding. It is made by heating butter and chocolate and whisking in eggs or condensed milk. Some versions also include golden syrup. After the mixture is cooled, crumbled digestive biscuits are incorporated into the batter. Optionally other dry ingredients may be mixed in as well such as assorted dried fruits, nuts and candies.

See also
Summer pudding
Tiffin (confectionery)

References

American desserts
Australian desserts
Chocolate desserts